SN 2020tlf was a Type II supernova that occurred 120 million light years away in the galaxy NGC 5731. The supernova marked the first time that a red supergiant star had been observed before, during, and after the event, being observed up to 130 days before. The progenitor star was between 10 and 12 solar masses.

Observations
The star was first observed by the Pan-STARRS telescope in the summer of 2020, with other telescopes such as ATLAS also observing it. It was initially believed that red supergiants were quiet before their demise; however, SN 2020tlf was observed emitting bright, intense radiation and ejecting massive amounts of gaseous material. Observations were also made throughout the electromagnetic spectrum, such as in the X-ray, ultraviolet, infrared and radio wave spectrums.

References

Supernovae
Astronomical objects discovered in 2020
Boötes